Mitch Fritz (born November 24, 1980) is a Canadian former professional ice hockey forward who played 20 games in the National Hockey League's 2008–09 season for the New York Islanders. Fritz was born in Osoyoos, British Columbia.

Playing career
Fritz made his NHL debut against the Philadelphia Flyers on October 30, 2008. He is a noted enforcer, regularly accumulating a high amount of penalty minutes and fighting majors each season. In 2005–2006, Fritz was awarded the AHL Man of the Year award for outstanding service in the Springfield community, while playing for the American Hockey League's Springfield Falcons.

On September 30, 2009, Fritz signed a one-year contract as a free agent to return to the Tampa Bay Lightning organization and was assigned to their AHL affiliate, the Norfolk Admirals. During the 2010–11 season, Fritz suffered from a groin injury and shortly retired.

His brother, Luke, played offensive guard for the CFL Montreal Alouettes and Winnipeg Blue Bombers.

Career statistics

References

External links

1980 births
Bridgeport Sound Tigers players
Canadian ice hockey left wingers
Columbus Cottonmouths (ECHL) players
Hamilton Bulldogs (AHL) players
Hartford Wolf Pack players
Ice hockey people from British Columbia
Living people
Lowell Lock Monsters players
Milwaukee Admirals players
New York Islanders players
Norfolk Admirals players
People from Osoyoos
Saint John Flames players
Springfield Falcons players
Tallahassee Tiger Sharks players
Undrafted National Hockey League players
Worcester IceCats players